Brian Van Flandern (born May 5, 1968) is an American mixologist, spirits historian, and award-winning cocktail book author. He has been called "America's Top Mixologist" by Food Network. His book, Vintage Cocktails, won the Gourmand World Cookbook Awards|Gourmand World Cookbook Award for best Cocktail book in the World 2009.

Van Flandern has cocktails served in over forty countries throughout the world and he has created original recipes and cocktail programs for famed chefs:  Michel Richard, Thomas Keller, Geoffrey Zakarian and others.

History
Van Flandern was raised in Washington, D.C. but moved to New York in 1990 to pursue an acting career at the National Shakespeare Conservatory. He bartended as a side job where he worked at such restaurants as Esca and Ilo until given the opportunity to open chef Thomas Keller's restaurant, Per Se.

Bibliography

See also 
 List of bartenders

References

External links 
Van Flandren's MyMixologist website

American bartenders
Living people
1968 births
Writers from Washington, D.C.
Writers from New York City